Jürgen Fassbender won the title, defeating François Jauffret 6–2, 5–7, 6–1, 6–4 in the final.

Seeds

Draw

Finals

Section 1

Section 2

External links
 1974 Bavarian Tennis Championships Singles draw

Singles